The Valiant Hombre is a 1949 American Western film directed by Wallace Fox and written by Betty Burbridge. The film stars Duncan Renaldo, Leo Carrillo, Kippee Valez, Charles Halton, Pedro de Cordoba and Stephen Chase. The film was released on June 14, 1949, by United Artists.

Plot

Cast 
Duncan Renaldo as the Cisco Kid
Leo Carrillo as Pancho
Kippee Valez as Kippee Valez
Charles Halton as Ed J. Hodges
Pedro de Cordoba as Padre Leonardo
Stephen Chase as Major Bruce Brady
David Leonard as Patrick Del Rio
Edmund Cobb as Marshal J.B. Scott
Frank Jaquet as Judge Perkins
Mickey Little as Bobby Del Rio
Wes Hudman as Deputy Post

References

External links 
 

1949 films
American black-and-white films
Films directed by Wallace Fox
Films scored by Albert Glasser
United Artists films
American Western (genre) films
1949 Western (genre) films
Adaptations of works by O. Henry
Cisco Kid
1940s English-language films
1940s American films